The White Widow may refer to:
Samantha Lewthwaite (born 1983), Islamic State terrorist suspect and widow of London tube bomber Germaine Lindsay
Sally-Anne Jones (1968-2017), English-born terrorist and propagandist for the Islamic State

See also 
White widow (disambiguation)